White Cap Peak is an  mountain summit located in Custer County, Idaho, United States.

Description
White Cap Peak ranks as the 18th-highest peak in Idaho and is part of the Lost River Range which is a subset of the Rocky Mountains. The mountain is set on land managed by Salmon–Challis National Forest. Neighbors include Leatherman Peak, 1.1 mile to the east, Mount Morrison 2.6 miles to the northwest, Little Regret Peak 3.55 miles east, and Borah Peak, the highest peak in Idaho, is 3.9 miles to the north-northwest. Leatherman Pass, elevation 10,512 ft, is the low point of the saddle midway between White Cap Peak and Leatherman Peak. Precipitation runoff from the mountain's slopes drains southwest to Big Lost River and northeast into headwaters of West Fork Pahsimeroi River.

Climate
Based on the Köppen climate classification, White Cap Peak is located in an alpine subarctic climate zone with long, cold, snowy winters, and cool to warm summers. Winter temperatures can drop below −10 °F with wind chill factors below −30 °F.

See also
 List of mountain peaks of Idaho

Gallery

References

External links
 White Cap Peak: Idaho: A Climbing Guide

Mountains of Idaho
Mountains of Custer County, Idaho
North American 3000 m summits
Salmon-Challis National Forest